Avery Township may refer to:

 Avery Township, Hancock County, Iowa
 Avery Township, Humboldt County, Iowa
 Avery Township, Michigan

Township name disambiguation pages